Marcelo Kiremitdjian, nicknamed Marcelo Djian or just Marcelo, (born 6 November 1966) is a Brazilian former professional footballer who played as a centre-back for Corinthians, Cruzeiro, Atlético Mineiro and Lyon. He earned two caps with the Brazil national team. Marcelo was the first in a series of Brazilian internationals who played or are playing with Lyon.

Honours
Corinthians
 Série A: 1990

Lyon
 Coupe de la Ligue runner-up: 1995–96
 UEFA Intertoto Cup: 1997

Individual
 Bola de Prata: 1990

References

External links

1966 births
Living people
Brazilian people of Armenian descent
Brazilian footballers
Footballers from São Paulo
Association football defenders
Brazil international footballers
Clube Atlético Mineiro players
Cruzeiro Esporte Clube players
Sport Club Corinthians Paulista players
Olympique Lyonnais players
Ligue 1 players
Brazilian expatriate footballers
Brazilian expatriate sportspeople in France
Expatriate footballers in France
Ethnic Armenian sportspeople
20th-century Brazilian people